Krushnanagar is a village in Jodiya taluka of Jamnagar District of Gujarat in India. The village has a Government School.

References 
Krushnanagar Primary School
Krushnanagar on Wikimapia

Villages in Jamnagar district